The Calvert L. Willey Award has been awarded every year since 1989. It is awarded to a member of the Institute of Food Technologists (IFT) who displayed meritorious and imaginative service to IFT. The award is named for Calvert L. Willey (1920-1994) who served as Executive Secretary and later Executive Director from 1961 until his retirement in 1987. Willey was given a distinguished service award by IFT at the 1987 Annual Meeting in Las Vegas, Nevada. This distinguished service award would be named in his honor and presented for the first time as an annual award at the 1989 Annual Meeting in Chicago, Illinois. It was the first IFT Award to be named for a living person.

Award winners receive an USD 3000 honorarium and a plaque from IFT.

Winners

References

List of past winners - Official site

Food technology awards